Maria-Magdalena Rusu (born 30 September 1999) is a Romanian rower. She competed in the women's eight event at the 2020 Summer Olympics.

References

External links

1999 births
Living people
Romanian female rowers
Olympic rowers of Romania
Rowers at the 2020 Summer Olympics
Sportspeople from Vaslui
20th-century Romanian women
21st-century Romanian women
World Rowing Championships medalists for Romania